List of British species of the fly family Pipunculidae

This list is based on the world catalogue by De Meyer (1996), with revision of British species by Chandler (1998)

Subfamily Chalarinae
Genus Chalarus Walker, 1834
C. argenteus Coe, 1966
C. basalis Loew, 1873
C. brevicaudis Jervis, 1992
C. clarus Jervis, 1992
C. decorus Jervis, 1992
C. elegantulus Jervis, 1992
C. exiguus (Haliday, 1833)
C. fimbriatus Coe, 1966
C. griseus Coe, 1966
C. gynocephalus Jervis, 1992
C. holosericeus (Meigen, 1824)
C. immanis Kehlmaier in Kehlmaier & Assmann, 2008
C. indistinctus Jervis, 1992
C. juliae Jervis, 1992
C. latifrons Hardy, 1943
C. longicaudis Jervis, 1992
C. marki Kehlmaier & Assmann, 2008
C. proprius Jervis, 1992
C. pughi Coe, 1966
C. spurius (Fallén, 1816)
Genus Jassidophaga Aczél, 1939
J. beatricis (Coe, 1966)
J. fasciata (von Roser, 1840)
J. pilosa (Zetterstedt, [1838])
J. villosa (von Roser, 1840)
Genus Verrallia Mik, 1899
V. aucta (Fallén, 1817)
Subfamily Nephrocerinae
Genus Nephrocerus Zetterstedt, 1838
N. flavicornis Zetterstedt, 1844
N. scutellatus (Macquart, 1834)
Subfamily Pipunculinae
Tribe Cephalopsini
Genus Cephalops Fallén, 1810
Sub Genus Beckerias Aczél, 1939
C. pannonicus (Aczél, 1939)
Sub Genus Cephalops Fallén, 1810
C. aeneus Fallén, 1810
C. vittipes (Zetterstedt, 1844)
Sub Genus Parabeckerias De Meyer, 1994
C. obtusinervis (Zetterstedt, 1844)
Sub Genus Semicephalops De Meyer, 1994
C. carinatus (Verrall, 1901)
C. penultimus Ackland, 1993
C. perspicuus (Meijere, 1907)
C. signatus (Becker, 1900)
C. straminipes (Becker, 1900)
C. subultimus Collin, 1956
C. ultimus (Becker, 1900)
C. varipes (Meigen, 1824)
Genus Cephalosphaera Enderlein, 1936
C. furcata (Egger, 1860)
C. germanica Aczél, 1940
Tribe Eudorylini
Genus Claraeola Aczél, 1940
C. halterata (Meigen, 1838)
C. melanostola (Becker, 1898)
Genus Clistoabdominalis Skevington, 2001
C. ruralis (Meigen, 1824)
Genus Dasydorylas Skevington & Yeates, 2001
D. horridus (Becker, 1898)
Genus Eudorylas Aczél, 1940
E. arcanus Coe, 1966
E. auctus Kehlmaier, 2005
E. caledonicus Ackland, 1999
E. coloratus (Becker, 1897)
E. fuscipes (Zetterstedt, 1844)
E. fusculus (Zetterstedt, 1844)
E. inferus Collin, 1956
E. jenkinsoni Coe, 1966
E. kowarzi (Becker, 1898)
E. longifrons Coe, 1966
E. montium (Becker, 1898)
E. obliquus Coe, 1966
E. obscurus Coe, 1966
E. restrictus Coe, 1966
E. subfascipes Collin, 1956
E. subterminalis Collin, 1956
E. terminalis (Thomson, 1870)
E. unicolor (Zetterstedt, 1844)
E. zermattensis (Becker, 1898)
E. zonatus (Zetterstedt, 1849)
E. zonellus Collin, 1956
Tribe Microcephalopsini
Genus Microcephalops De Meyer, 1989
M. opacus (Fallén, 1816)
Tribe Pipunculini
Genus Pipunculus Latreille, 1802
P. campestris Latreille, 1802
P. elegans Egger, 1860
P. fonsecai Coe, 1966
P. lenis Kuznetzov, 1991
P. lichtwardti Kozánek, 1981
P. oldenbergi Collin, 1956
P. omissinervis Becker, 1889
P. tenuirostris Kozánek, 1981
P. violovitshi Kuznetzov, 1991
P. zugmayeriae Kowarz, 1887
Tribe Tomosvaryellini
Genus Dorylomorpha Aczél, 1939
Subgenus Dorylomorpha Aczél, 1939
D. confusa (Verrall, 1901)
D. extricata (Collin, 1937)
D. imparata (Collin, 1937)
D. rufipes (Meigen, 1824)
Subgenus Dorylomyia Albrecht, 1990
D. beckeri (Aczél, 1939)
Subgenus Dorylomyza Albrecht, 1990
D. albitarsis (Zetterstedt, 1844)
D. anderssoni Albrecht, 1979
D. clavifemora Coe, 1966
D. fennica Albrecht, 1979
D. haemorrhoidalis (Zetterstedt, [1838])
D. hungarica (Aczél, 1939)
D. infirmata (Collin, 1937)
D. occidens (Hardy, 1939)
D. xanthopus (Thomson, 1870)
Subgenus Pipunculina Albrecht, 1990
D. maculata (Walker, 1834)
Genus Tomosvaryella  Aczél, 1939
T. cilitarsis (Strobl, 1910)
T. geniculata (Meigen, 1824)
T. kuthyi Aczél, 1944
T. littoralis (Becker, 1898)
T. minima (Becker, 1898)
T. palliditarsis (Collin, 1931)
T. sylvatica (Meigen, 1824)

References 

Pipunculidae
Pipunculidae
Pipunculidae
Diptera of Europe